"Yerbatero" is a rock song by Colombian singer-songwriter Juanes released as the lead single from his fifth studio album P.A.R.C.E.. It was released digitally on June 10, 2010 through Universal Records. A Digital EP with three remixes was released later on October 12, 2010. It is also released a Banda version of the song on October 19, 2010.

Background
The song is written and produced by Juanes himself along with Stephen Lipson, who has worked with artists such as Annie Lennox and Paul McCartney. The lyrics relate to people who suffer from love and its hardships.

Critical reception
Ricardo Companioni from Aol Radio Blog said that "The guitar-driven rock track produced Stephen Lipson, is a total departure from the romantic pop songs that permeated his last album".

Live performances
The song was performed for the first time at FIFA's 2010 World Cup Kick-Off Concert at June 10, 2010, in Orlando Stadium in Johannesburg along with his hit single "La Camisa Negra". He was invited along artists such as Shakira, The Black Eyed Peas and Alicia Keys, among other artists. He also performed the song during Colombia's inauguration day and at the 2010 Premios Juventud.

Chart performance
The song debuted at number 35 on the Billboard Hot Latin Songs, and number 4 on the Latin Pop Songs. On Spain the song debuted at number #27.
Herbalist has been a success since its launch, only 12 hours of its release and was ranked number one in Colombia and in 6,400 after selling iTunes downloads in the first week. On the Billboard Latin Songs, the song is charted at number one, becoming on his seventh number one single on the chart. "Yerbatero" debuted on the Bubbling Under Hot 100 Singles chart of Billboard, at position 17, equivalent to position 117 on the Billboard Hot 100.

Music video

Development
A music video for the song directed by Brandon Parvini was shot; filming commencing on May 29, 2010 according to a making of video released on his website. The video premiered on July 14, 2010.

Synopsis
The video shows Juanes playing guitar and singing in outer space as they grow flowers and plants around because it is a matter which is inspired by the ancient sorcerers who roamed the villages to sell natural ways to heal.

Track listing
iTunes digital single

Charts

Year-end charts

Versions/remixes
Album version – 3:24
Banda version – 3:26
Soul Mekanik Remix – 6:41
Tarantella & Redanka Remix – 6:32
Histeria Music Group Remix – 4:40

Release history

References

2010 singles
Juanes songs
Number-one singles in Colombia
Spanish-language songs
Songs written by Juanes
FIFA World Cup songs
Song recordings produced by Stephen Lipson
2010 songs
Universal Music Latino singles
2010 FIFA World Cup